Terra Sancta College of Jerusalem serves as the cultural centre of the Franciscan Custody of the Holy Land and as a succursal institution (dependency) of Saint Saviour's Latin parish. It was initially created in the 1920s as a school for the children of Jerusalem, regardless of their religious affiliation. It stands at the soutwestern extremity of the Talbiyeh neighbourhood of West Jerusalem, on the corner of Paris Square.

History

Interwar boys' school
The building was erected in 1926 to house a boys' school named in Italian "Opera Cardinal Ferrari" in honour of a recently deceased Archbishop of Milan who had shown much engagement for social justice. The school was designed by the Franciscan architect Antonio Barluzzi, who crowned the building with a replica of the statue of the Virgin Mary which stands on top of the Milan Cathedral, the Madonnina. It was inaugurated in 1927.

The school operated for two years: in 1928-29 it had 270 enrolled pupils, only one hundred of which were Catholic; and 1929–30, with just 130 pupils. The children were taught in eight separate classes, covering primary school and high school. Its activity ended due to lack of funds, and the property was then entrusted to the safe hands of the Custody of the Holy Land.

Under the Franciscans the Terra Santa College flourished, with a constantly growing number of pupils throughout the 1930s. It remained open to children of all religions, registering 360 pupils in 1936–37, of which 85 were Latin Christians, 171 Greek Orthodox Christians, Armenians, Syriacs, Copts and Protestants, 53 Muslims and 31 Jews. The total number of pupils rose until the closure of the school in 1947, numbering 475 in 1940–41.

1947-1949 war
In 1947, the British authorities declared the area around the school a security zone, access was forbidden, and the school was forced to close. As a result of the 1948 Arab–Israeli War, Jerusalem became divided and the Arab pupils living in the eastern part of the city were cut off from their school, which is located in west Jerusalem. The Franciscans, under whom the Terra Sancta College had arguably become the most prestigious school in the Middle East, didn't allow their centre of education to shut down for long, opening a new school in Amman already in 1948 and, in 1949, another Terra Sancta College in the Old City of Jerusalem.

Hebrew University (1949-1990s)
In 1949 the Hebrew University of Jerusalem (HUJI), whose previous campus on Mount Scopus, now in East Jerusalem, also had to be abandoned, took over part of the premises. Some of the scenes in the novel "A Tale of Love and Darkness" as well as "My Michael" by the Israeli writer Amos Oz play in those years inside the building. Several departments of the university moved in, and by the late 1980s several of them were still housed there, including the university publishing house, Magnes Press, the offices of the Friends of the Hebrew University, the Research and Development Authority, and the headquarter of the World Union of Jewish Students, sharing the building with the British Council Library and the Dante Alighieri Society for Italian Culture.

Franciscan cultural and communications centre
The Custody of the Holy Land pursued the return of the building, and by the end of the 1990s they received it back as their property, which it remains to this day.

Current use
Several cultural departments of the Custody are working now from the College premises: the communications department in charge of the official media in the Holy Land, which includes a multimedia centre broadcasting news programmes in different languages, and the editorial office of the Christian Media Center and of the French-language Terre Sainte Magazine.

The house is run by the Franciscan Sisters of the Immaculate, of whom some are living there. The premises are also used as living quarters by Franciscan friars, such as the director of the Custody's school of music, who is also in charge of relations with the Jewish world, as well as some religious and students of the Studium Biblicum Franciscanum academic society, along with volunteers who work with the Custody performing pastoral, cultural and social activities. It comprises a ground floor and three upper storeys.

Description
Antonio Barluzzi's design combines elements of Italian Renaissance with oriental ones. From the central courtyard one can reach the wing containing the chapel. The replica of the Madonnina decorates the roof.

See also
Terra Santa College, Cyprus

References

External links

Educational institutions established in the 1920s
Schools in Jerusalem